Roy Franklin Zimmerman (September 13, 1916 – November 22, 1991) was a professional baseball first baseman. He played part of the 1945 season in Major League Baseball for the New York Giants in 1945.

Zimmerman is one of many ballplayers who only appeared in the major leagues during World War II. He made his major league debut on September 2, 1945 in a doubleheader against the Brooklyn Dodgers at the Polo Grounds. He hit well and exhibited some power during his one-month stay with the Giants.

Season and career totals include 27 games played, a .276 batting average (27-for-98), 5 home runs, 15 runs batted in, 14 runs scored, and a slugging percentage of .439. He made 3 errors in 25 games at first base and had a fielding percentage of .988.

Zimmerman died in his hometown of Pine Grove, Schuylkill County, Pennsylvania, at the age of 75.

External links 

Retrosheet

Major League Baseball first basemen
New York Giants (NL) players
Perth-Cornwall Bisons players
Moline Plowboys players
Columbia Reds players
Tyler Trojans players
Macon Peaches players
Greenville Spinners players
Kansas City Blues (baseball) players
Newark Bears (IL) players
Drummondville Cubs players
Oakland Oaks (baseball) players
Tulsa Oilers (baseball) players
Baseball players from Pennsylvania
1916 births
1991 deaths